Gal Weinstein is an Israeli artist.

Biography 
Gal Weinstein, born 1970, Ramat Gan, Israel. Lives and works in Tel Aviv.

Education 
 1992–1993 Theater Set Design, Tel Aviv University
 1993–1997 BFA, Bezalel Academy of Arts and Design, Jerusalem

Teaching 
 Art, High school, Kiryat Ono.
 2000–2008 Oranim, Academic College of Education, Kiryat Tivon
 2002–2008 Bezalel Academy of Art and Design, Jerusalem
 from 2008 Shenkar College, Multidisciplinary Art Department, Ramat Gan

Awards and prizes 
 1998 Prize for a Young Artist, The Ministry of Education, Culture and Sport
 1999 Artist-Teacher Fellowship, Israeli Ministry of Education and Culture
 2000 Artist-Teacher Fellowship, The Ministry of Education, Culture and Sport
 2001 Sharet Foundation Fellowship, Israel-America Fund for Culture
 2003 Hadassah and Rafael Klatchkin Grant for Art, America-Israel Cultural Foundation
 2004 Israel Cultural Excellence Award
 2004 Tel Aviv Museum and Isracard's Israeli Artist Award
 2006 Beatrice S. Kolliner Young Israeli Artist Award, Israel Museum, Jerusalem
 2006 Israeli Ministry of Culture Award

Outdoor and public art 
"White Game, Black Work", The Avi Ran Sculpture Garden, Haifa 2008

References

External links 
 
 
 
 

Israeli contemporary artists
Living people
1970 births
Israeli painters
People from Ramat Gan